Directions is a 2017 Bulgarian drama film directed by Stephan Komandarev. It was screened in the Un Certain Regard section at the 2017 Cannes Film Festival.

Cast
 Ivan Barnev as Vlado
 Georgi Kadurin as Popov
 Borisleva Stratieva as Lora
 Anna Komandareva as Nikol
 Vassil Vassilev as Misho

References

External links
 
 

2017 films
2017 drama films
Bulgarian drama films
2010s Bulgarian-language films